Patrinia is a genus of herbaceous plants in the honeysuckle family (Caprifoliaceae). There are about 17 species native to grassy mountain habitats in China, Siberia and Japan. These are unassuming clump-forming perennial plants having thin, erect stems with few leaves and bearing a terminal inflorescence with yellow or white flowers.

Selected species
 Patrinia gibbosa
 Patrinia scabiosifolia
 Patrinia triloba
 Patrinia villosa

Fossil record
One fossil fruit of †Patrinia palaeosibirica has been extracted from borehole samples of the Middle Miocene fresh water deposits in Nowy Sacz Basin, West Carpathians, Poland.

References

External links

Patrinia Genus
 

Valerianoideae
Caprifoliaceae genera